Baptist is a surname. Notable people with this name include:

 Marty Baptist
 Maria Baptist
 Travis Baptist
 Willem Baptist
 George Baptist
 Rachael Baptist
 Glenford Baptist
 Edward E. Baptist

See also 
 Baptist (disambiguation)
 Baptiste (name)
 Baptista (Portuguese surname) meaning "Baptist"
 Baptistin (French name)